The 2020–21 season was the 134th season in existence of Barnsley Football Club and the club's second consecutive season in the second division of English football. In addition to the domestic league, Barnsley participated in this season's editions of the FA Cup, and the EFL Cup.

Squad

Appearances and goals correct as of 8 May 2021.

Statistics

  

|-
!colspan=14|Players out on loan:

|-
!colspan=14|Players who have left the club:

|}

Goals record

Disciplinary record

Transfers

Transfers in

Loans in

Loans out

Transfers out

Pre-season and friendlies

Competitions

Overview

EFL Championship

League table

Results summary

Results by matchday

Matches
The 2020–21 season fixtures were released on 21 August.

Play-offs

FA Cup

The third round draw was made on 30 November, with Premier League and EFL Championship clubs all entering the competition. The draw for the fourth and fifth round were made on 11 January, conducted by Peter Crouch.

EFL Cup

The first round draw was made on 18 August, live on Sky Sports, by Paul Merson. The draw for both the second and third round were confirmed on September 6, live on Sky Sports by Phil Babb.

Notes

References

External links

Barnsley F.C. seasons
Barnsley F.C.